"5-4-3-2-1" is a 1964 song by British band Manfred Mann. It was written by Mann, Mike Hugg and Paul Jones, and peaked at #5 on the UK Singles Chart thanks to weekly television exposure from being the theme tune for the ITV pop music television programme Ready Steady Go!. This would be the last single released before bass player Dave Richmond left the band.

In an interview with Uncut, keyboardist Manfred Mann said that he regarded Ready Steady Go as being like a rocket, and wrote the song as a countdown to launch it. The song contains the self-referential lyric "Uh-huh, it was the Mannnn-freds!".

Upon the success of the single, the group authored the follow-up single "Hubble Bubble (Toil and Trouble)", which peaked at #11 in the UK. Due to this they resorted to recording a cover song as their next release. This release was "Do Wah Diddy Diddy" which became a trans-Atlantic #1 hit.

In 1982 it was used for the advert for the chocolate bar 54321 also performed by Manfred Mann and featured Rik Mayall in the early adverts, in 1997 the Spice Girls' jingle used to introduce Channel 5 was loosely based on 5-4-3-2-1. British supermarket chain Tesco used the song in adverts for £5 off a £40 spend in 2012.

Personnel 

 Paul Jones – lead vocals, harmonica
 Manfred Mann – keyboards, backing vocals
 Mike Vickers – guitar
 Dave Richmond – bass guitar, backing vocals
 Mike Hugg –  drums

References

1964 singles
1964 songs
Manfred Mann songs
Song recordings produced by John Burgess